The Advanced Technology Airborne Computer (ATAC) was a product of Itek (a division of Litton Industries), used on US naval aircraft, and the NASA Galileo (spacecraft).

The ATAC was built using AMD 2901 4-bit processors and had a basic cycle time of 250 ns. It could be programmed in HAL/S, and could be microprogrammed to add new instructions. The Galileo project added four instructions.

Use on US Naval aircraft

Use by Galileo project 
The Galileo Attitude and Articulation Control System (AACSE) was controlled by two Itek Advanced Technology Airborne Computers (ATAC), built using radiation-hardened 2901s. The project wrote their own GRACOS (Galileo realtime Attitude Control Operating System).

The Galileo project had radiation-hardened 2901 processors made (by Sandia National Lab) for the spacecraft.

References

Further reading 
 

Aircraft Research aircraft
Computers